Die 4. Dimension ("The Fourth Dimension") is the third studio album by the German hip hop group Die Fantastischen Vier. It peaked at No. 14 on the German charts, No. 23 on the Austrian charts, and at No. 27 in Switzerland.

Track listing 
"Neues Land" – 2:06
"Die 4. Dimension" – 4:38
"Tag am Meer" – 4:17
"Zu geil für diese Welt" – 4:07
"Weiter weg" – 0:54
"Schizophren" – 5:01
"Ganz normal" – 3:34
"Smudo schweift aus" – 3:47
"Noch weiter weg" – 0:59
"Sieh dich im Spiegel an" – 3:57
"Laut reden nichts sagen" – 3:31
"Alles ist neu" – 3:34
"Ganz weit weg" – 1:05
"Mach dich frei" – 3:25
"Genug ist genug" – 4:03
"Weg" – 0:04

Singles

External links
 Official website (in German)
 Discogs discography

1992 albums
Die Fantastischen Vier albums